The Goblin and the Empty Chair is a 2009 children's picture book by Mem Fox and illustrated by Leo and Diane Dillon. It is a modern fairy tale, and is about a hermit goblin who observes a farming family that is so aggrieved (possibly due to the loss of a child) that they cannot carry out their daily tasks; for 3 days the goblin secretly does their work not realising that he has been seen, eventually the goblin is invited to partake in breakfast with them.

Publication history
 2009, USA, Beach Lane Books 
 2009, Australia, Viking Australia

Reception
Reviews of The Goblin and the Empty Chair have been favourable with Publishers Weekly writing: "Acceptance and healing are less common picture book themes; Fox (Time for Bed) handles them with particular grace". Kirkus Reviews called it a perfect combination of words and images.

The Goblin and the Empty Chair has also been reviewed by Booklist, School Library Journal, Horn Book Guides, Library Media Connection, The Bulletin of the Center for Children's Books, Magpies, and Reading Time.

References

External links
 Library holdings of The Goblin and the Empty Chair

Australian picture books
2009 children's books
Picture books by Mem Fox
Picture books based on fairy tales